Rafael Nadal defeated Milos Raonic in the final, 6–2, 6–2 to win the men's singles tennis title at the 2013 Canadian Open.

Novak Djokovic was the two-time defending champion, but lost in the semifinals to Nadal.

For the first time since 1992, five Canadians reached the second round or better. Raonic and Vasek Pospisil both reached the semifinals where they played against each other, with Raonic becoming the first home finalist since Robert Bédard won the title in 1958.

Seeds
The top eight seeds receive a bye into the second round.

Draw

Finals

Top half

Section 1

Section 2

Bottom half

Section 3

Section 4

Qualifying

Seeds

Qualifiers

Qualifying draw

First qualifier

Second qualifier

Third qualifier

Fourth qualifier

Fifth qualifier

Sixth qualifier

Seventh qualifier

References
General

Specific

2013 ATP World Tour
Men's Singles